Finnegans Wake is a 2011 album by Tangerine Dream. It is roughly the group's 125th release.

Tracklist

Personnel
Edgar Froese -  keyboards, synthesizers, guitar
Thorsten Quaeschning - keyboards, guitar, flute, percussion
 Linda Spa : Keyboards, synthesizers
 Iris Camaa : Percussion, vocals
 Bernhard Beibl : Violin, guitar 
 Hoshiko Yamane : Electric and acoustic violin

References

2011 albums
Tangerine Dream albums